God's Neighbors is a 2012 Israeli drama film directed by Meni Yaish.

The film premiered at the 2012 Cannes Film Festival.

Plot
A band of violent Hasidim patrol their Bat Yam neighborhood and terrorize Arabs and non-observant Jews. One named Avi finds himself falling for an unorthodox woman, and his faith is tested.

Cast 
 Roy Assaf as Avi Bahar
 Gal Fridman as Kobi Shmaya
 Itzik Golan as Yaniv Lugassi 
  as Miri

References

External links 

2012 films
2012 drama films
Anti-Orthodox Judaism sentiment
Films about Orthodox and Hasidic Jews
Films critical of Judaism and Jews
Films about religious violence
2010s Hebrew-language films
Israeli drama films